Tzu Hui Institute of Technology is a private university in Nanzhou Township, Pingtung County, Taiwan.

The institute offers undergraduate and graduate programs in various fields, including engineering, management, design, and humanities.

History
The school was founded as Tzu Hui Vocational School of Nursing and Midwifery in August 1964. In August 2000, the school was upgraded to Tzu Hui Institute of Technology. In 2020, the university had an enrollment rate of less than 60%.

Faculties
 Nursing
 Digital Media Design (Information Management)
 Early Childhood Care and Education
 Physical Therapy (Rehabilitation Technology)
 Leisure, Recreation and Tourism Management
 Styling and Cosmetology
 Food and Beverage Management
 Tourism Affairs

Campus
The university campus building is constructed on a land belongs to Taiwan Sugar Corporation.

Transportation
The school is accessible by bus from Nanzhou Station of Taiwan Railways.

See also
 List of universities in Taiwan

References

External links

  

1964 establishments in Taiwan
Educational institutions established in 1964
Universities and colleges in Pingtung County
Universities and colleges in Taiwan
Technical universities and colleges in Taiwan